Jannes van der Wal (November 12, 1956 in Driezum – September 24, 1996 in Groningen) was a Dutch/Frisian draughts player and world champion in the game. He also played chess at a nearly competitive level.

Career
He became world champion in São Paulo in 1982. After that he garnered attention for his humorous or even eccentric personality. His interviews on Dutch TV were unusual involving a full minute where he did not talk or others where he reacted oddly on being asked how old he was.

After this he became a minor celebrity appearing in a few programs on Dutch television. He was also the subject of a 1999 documentary titled Jannes.

He is believed to have held the record on simultaneous play as he played against 225 players on July 16, 1987. He won against 93% of the 225 opponents with 14 games being draws and 4 losses. Anton van Berkel has since beaten this record. 

In 1996 Jannes van der Wal died of leukemia.

External links
Profile (In Dutch)
Chess cafe (brief mention)
Pictures, several in the third row are of him
Checkers record site

1956 births
1996 deaths
Dutch draughts players
Players of international draughts
People from Dantumadiel
Deaths from leukemia
Deaths from cancer in the Netherlands